= Muda, Rio de Janeiro =

Region of Rio de Janeiro, Brazil

Coordinates: 22°56′10″S 43°14′45″W

Muda is a region of Rio de Janeiro, but not officially recognized as a neighborhood.
